Luis Miguel Seguí (born October 4, 1976) is a Spanish actor and producer, He played Leo in La que se avecina until his retirement at the ninth season in 2015.

References

External links
 

1975 births
Living people
21st-century Spanish male actors
Spanish male television actors